Joey McMahon is a partner at Bioventure Partners, former vice president of impact investment at KBI Biopharma, the creator of the childhood cancer technology Anddit, founder and CEO of The Monday Life, and a former manager of the Duke Blue Devils men's basketball team.

Education 
McMahon attended Duke University for his undergraduate degree. He was a 4-year student manager for the Duke men's basketball team.

McMahon also earned his MBA from Duke University's Fuqua School of Business. During that time, he was a brand strategist for the Coach K Leadership Center and the recipient of the class of 1990 Scholarship for Service.

100MileGroup 
From 2009-2011, McMahon was the director of operations at the 100MileGroup, a NYC brand-incubator launched by Marquis Jet owner Jesse Itzler. The incubator was part of several major branding deals that catalyzed start-up firms.

The Monday Life 
McMahon founded The Monday Life in 2011 and is currently the CEO. The Monday Life is a national nonprofit organization that helps hospitalized children feel better and heal faster by improving their patient environments. The nonprofit is at six children's hospitals across the country. The Monday Life is uniquely known for its crowd-sourcing fundraising platform, which is based on donors giving $1 every Monday.
The Monday Life recently filmed a music video with patients and members of the Duke Men's Basketball team which was featured on both CBS and NBC Sports.
McMahon was also the host for The Monday Life's segment of Google's and Mashable's first ever Giving Tuesday Hangout-a-thon and has spoken about the cause at Fuqua's Sustainable Business & Social Impact conference and with Jessica Jackley, founder of Kiva, at The Duke Colloquium.

In November of 2016, McMahon cohosted Give Gala 2016, a sold-out charity event where attendees offer their services and talents, rather than money, to support hospitalized children.

KBI Biopharma 
From 2013 to 2022, McMahon was the Vice President of Impact Investment at KBI Biopharma, a biopharmaceutical contract development and manufacturing organization that accelerates the development of innovative discoveries into life-changing biological products and expands global access of medicines to patients in need.

Anddit 
McMahon is also the creator of Anddit, a technology that connects people to support resources. Anddit partnered with the Coalition Against Childhood Cancer, the Association of Pediatric Hematology/Oncology Nurses, and the Association of Pediatric Oncology Social Workers to deliver this technology - called the "Hope Portal" - to patients nationwide.

References 

Living people
Duke University alumni
Fuqua School of Business alumni
1987 births
American company founders
American chief executives